Pentagestrone, also known as 17α-hydroxyprogesterone 3-cyclopentyl enol ether, is a steroidal progestin of the 17α-hydroxyprogesterone group that was never marketed. An acetate ester, pentagestrone acetate (Gestovis, Gestovister), has been marketed for clinical use. Pentagestrone was described in the literature in 1960.

See also
 Quingestrone

References

Abandoned drugs
Cyclopentyl ethers
Pregnanes
Progestogen ethers
Progestogens